Emily Joy Newsom (born September 4, 1983) is an American professional racing cyclist, who currently rides for UCI Women's Continental Team . Newsom won the inaugural Gravel Locos 150 in Hico, Texas in May 2021.

References

External links
 

1983 births
Living people
American female cyclists
Place of birth missing (living people)
21st-century American women